Longfeng Township(), is a rural township in Zhuzhou County, Zhuzhou City, Hunan Province, People's Republic of China.

Cityscape
The township is divided into 13 villages, the following areas: Longfeng Village, Changyuan Village, Shengtian Village, Tiantaisi Village, Xingtai Village, Tianshi Village, Zhongtian Village, Maotang Village, Sifang Village, Shantian Village, Jinfu Village, Lima Village, and Fuchong Village.

References

Historic township-level divisions of Zhuzhou County